is the debut indie-label single by the Japanese girl group Momoiro Clover, released in Japan on August 5, 2009.

Reception 
The single debuted at the 23rd position in the weekly Oricon singles chart.

Track listing

Chart performance

References

External links 
 CD single profile on the official site

2009 singles
Japanese-language songs
Momoiro Clover Z songs
2009 songs